Aegopis verticillus is a species of air-breathing land snail, a terrestrial pulmonate gastropod mollusk in the family Zonitidae, the true glass snails. It was first described in 1822 by Lamarck. It is defined as Least Concern on the ICUN Red List.

Distribution
This species occurs in Europe, including Bosnia, Montenegro, Serbia, Hungary, Czech Republic, Italy and the Alps, and has been introduced to Germany.

References

Zonitidae
Taxa named by Jean-Baptiste Lamarck
Gastropods described in 1822